The 1991 British League season was the 57th season of the top tier of speedway in the United Kingdom and the 27th known as the British League.

Summary
Wolverhampton Wolves won the league for the first time in their history. The club which was first founded in 1928 had only ever won the Provincial Midland League in 1962 and the Provincial League in 1963. They were led by their American star Sam Ermolenko, who became the first rider to push Hans Nielsen from the top of the averages after eight consecutive years at the top. The Wolves team relied on two more American riders, Ronnie Correy and Sam's younger brother Charles Ermolenko, in addition to Englishman Graham Jones to seal the title from Bradford. Bradford gained consolation by winning the Knockout Cup, led by English international pair Simon Wigg and Gary Havelock.

Wimbledon Dons started the season but only ran until June before withdawing from the league. Eastbourne Eagles stepped in to replace Wimbledon and complete the Wimbledon fixtures for the remainder of the season.

Final table
M = Matches; W = Wins; D = Draws; L = Losses; Pts = Total Points

British League Knockout Cup
The 1991 British League Knockout Cup was the 53rd edition of the Knockout Cup for tier one teams. Bradford Dukes were the winners.

First round

Quarter-finals

Semi-finals

Final

First leg

Second leg

Bradford Dukes were declared Knockout Cup Champions, winning on aggregate 97-83.

Leading final averages

Riders & final averages
Belle Vue

 8.45
 8.28
 7.60
 7.59
 7.32
 6.09
 5.22
 5.09
 3.88
 3.31

Berwick

 9.92 
 9.63
 7.85
 5.86
 4.73
 4.56
 3.89
 2.65
 1.70
 1.33

Bradford

 9.89
 8.43
 8.32
 6.94 
 6.79
 6.61
 3.51

Coventry

 8.64 
 7.90 
 7.56
 6.77
 6.76
 4.84
 4.39
 3.38
 2.77
 0.19

Cradley Heath

 9.54
 8.77
 8.24
 8.20
 6.56
 5.29
 4.46
 3.15
 3.07

Eastbourne/Wimbledon

 9.44
 8.48
 6.67
 6.59
 5.88
 4.98
 4.75
 4.29
 3.59

Ipswich

 8.44
 8.15
 7.33 
 6.96
 6.39
 6.25
 5.17
 3.74

King's Lynn

 9.06 
 8.28
 7.08
 5.51
 4.50
 4.23
 4.13

Oxford

 10.50 
 9.12
 7.17
 7.13
 4.00
 2.95
 2.93
 2.64
 1.91

Poole Pirates

 8.67
 8.00
 6.43
 6.32
 6.21
 4.78
 4.08
 2.06

Reading

 8.47
 8.43
 8.41
 7.67
 6.78
 6.50
 4.47
 2.38
 1.41

Swindon

 8.55
 8.47
 7.75
 7.12
 6.36
 5.87
 4.49
 4.38
 4.00

Wolverhampton

 10.74
 9.58
 7.25
 6.57
 5.32
 5.32
 4.29
 3.75

See also
List of United Kingdom Speedway League Champions
Knockout Cup (speedway)

References

British League
1991 in British motorsport